Mime Misu (21 January 1888 – 1953) (born Mișu Rosescu) was a Romanian ballet dancer, pantomime artist, film actor and director.

Early acting life
Mime Misu was born in the market town of Botoșani, Romania, into a family of artistes. He was the nephew of the 'world famous' Rahel. He was on the stage from an early age in ballet and pantomime, and he displayed enough talent to be given a free place at Bucharest Art Academy. During his studies he was assigned to the Royal National Theatre, and after graduating with honors he successfully played in provincial theatres in Romania. In 1900 he performed at the 1900 World Fair in Paris, and then took his own productions to Berlin, Vienna, Budapest and London.

Film director
Misu worked for the film production companies Lux and Pathé Frères in Paris before signing up with Continental-Kunstfilm of Berlin in 1912 where he wrote and directed three films: Das Gespenst von Clyde, In Nacht und Eis, and Das Mirakel. Misu made one more film in Germany, Der Excentric-Club for Projektions-AG Union (PAGU).

An article in the Berlin journal Licht-Bild-Bühne in 1914 called him the 'Napoleon of film' (German: 'Napoleon der Filmkunst'), referring to his various technological advances. When Emil Schunemann (the cameraman for In Nacht und Eis and Das Mirakel) called him a barber in his memoirs, he wasn't being particularly complimentary.

Misu went to the USA but only made one known film with his Misu-Film Co., The Money God.<ref>1914 dreht Mime Misu bei Metropolitan Film Co., in den USA, seinen letzten uns heute bekannten Film The Money God". Als Linzenzdatum wird hier der 10.2.1914 mit der Nummer 2118 angegeben. See Filmblatt 9, in German (find full ref!!)</ref> In 1915 he directed Ontmaskerd ('Unmasked') in the Netherlands under his real name, Misu Rosescu. Like In Nacht und Eis, this film also contains a scene of a ship sinking.Ontmaskerd (Unmasked), AKA De Wereld (The World). Production: Filmfabriek-Hollandia, Producer: Maurits H. Binger.

Misu travelled to the US every year from 1915 to 1917. His Berlin address in 1915 was Nachodstraße 25, Berlin-Wilmersdorf. In 1920/21 Misugraph-Film G.m.b.H., had its offices at Martin-Luther-Straße 28, Berlin, according to the Reichs-Kino-Adressbuch.

In 1921 Misu seems to have misrepresented himself as to his level of involvement at Famous Players Lasky, and to have caused some considerable offence. This led to an exchange of letters in the Berlin film journal Film-Kurier.

Information about his later career and death is uncertain.

Selected filmography
He directed at least six films:
 Das Gespenst von Clyde (1912)In Nacht und Eis (1912) (and also possibly played the part of the radio operator)
 Das Mirakel  (1912), later Das Marienwunder: eine alte Legende Der Excentric-Club (1913/14)
 The Money God (1914)
 Ontmaskerd'' (1915)

References
 Notes

 Citations

 Sources
 
 
 
 
 
 

1888 births
1953 deaths
People from Botoșani
Romanian film directors
Romanian male film actors
Romanian male silent film actors
Romanian male ballet dancers
Romanian expatriates in Germany
Impostors